"My Nigga" (edited version titled as "My Hitta" or "My N*gga") is a song by American rapper YG, released on September 17, 2013, as the lead single from his debut studio album My Krazy Life (2014). The song, produced by frequent collaborator DJ Mustard, features guest appearances from CTE World founder Jeezy and Rich Homie Quan. It interpolates "The Sky is the Limit", as written and performed by Lil Wayne as well as the popular refrain from C-Murder's single "Down for My N's".

YG and Jeezy appeared on MTV's RapFix on September 4, 2013. At the closing of the show, the two premiered the music video for "My Nigga", which had been filmed a month prior in Atlanta, Georgia. On December 3, 2013, YG performed "My Nigga" for the first time on national television, on DJ Skee's SKEE Live on AXS TV. The next month he performed the song alongside Rich Homie Quan, DJ Mustard and Jeezy on The Arsenio Hall Show. Following that performance, YG was presented with the official platinum plaque from the RIAA commemorating the sales of over a million copies of the single. The song later went quadruple platinum.

It was met with generally positive reviews from music critics. XXL and Complex named it one of the best songs of 2013. Many critics also praised the chemistry of the collaborators and the song's minimalistic production. The song peaked at number 19 on the US Billboard Hot 100 and at number 53 on the UK Singles Chart. As of March 16, 2014 the song has sold 1,204,457 copies in the United States according to Nielsen Soundscan.

Background 
After YG announced that his debut album would be executive produced by Atlanta rapper Jeezy, the two began frequently collaborating. In June 2013, YG revealed that he had signed to Jeezy's record label CTE World. Prior to the signing announcement "My Nigga" was released as a track on a CTE World EP, #It'sThaWorld. The song was then included on the first official CTE World mixtape, Boss Yo Life Up Gang, which was released in August 2013. Following the music video's release, the song was released by Def Jam as the mixtape's lead single on September 17, 2013.

Composition 
"My Nigga" was written by Keenon Jackson, Jay Jenkins, Dequantes Lamar and produced by DJ Mustard and Mikely Adam. It interpolates "The Sky is the Limit", as written and performed by Lil Wayne. The song also interpolates the popular refrain from C-Murder's single "Down 4 My Niggaz". The song is a street anthem that celebrates friendship. Overall its message is that to hang with YG and his crew, "it's a requirement that you don’t trip over potential romantic interests, be averse to snitching, be willing to catch a case when necessary, and just be about getting money."

Critical reception 
"My Nigga" was met with generally positive reviews from music critics. Brian Josephs from XXL stated the song, "is still the best song on My Krazy Life, but part of the reason it succeeds represents why the project as a whole is a solid effort. It represents Compton recklessness to the fullest, but that sensibility never comes in the way of relating basic thrills, resulting in an instantly gratifying reward." David Jeffries from AllMusic said the collaborators chemistry is perfect and called the song great overall. Michael Madden of Consequence of Sound called it one of the album's essential tracks saying, the song is "YG sound in miniature" and an instant banger. Jordan Sowunmi of Now called it notably smooth and credited it for fitting perfectly with the cohesion and strong sequencing of My Krazy Life. Jesal 'Jay Soul' Padania of RapReviews said it was an "inescapable street anthem." Dorian Mendoza of PrettyMuchAmazing stated, "the unabashed homie loyalty anthem of the year, serves powerfully as the centerpiece of the album." Jesse Fairfax of HipHopDX called it repetitive and catchy.

Complex ranked "My Nigga" number 30 on their list of the 50 best songs of 2013. They commented saying, To YG fans, it may have come as a surprise that "My Nigga" took off the way it did. After all, dude had been making comparable if not better and catchier songs with DJ Mustard for years. Somehow though, the stars aligned for this one, and by stars we mean Rich Homie Quan and Young Jeezy. Having catapulted himself to the forefront of catchy-hook stardom with that song about vague emotional responses to jealousy, Quan was able to strike again while the iron was still hot with the "My Nigga" chorus. YG himself switches up his own flow for this one, sing-rapping through his ode to his fellow man. Young Jeezy comes through as the older brother to shine his veteran sense of camaraderie onto the young bucks, and it feels genuine. Having one of Mustard's meanest beats set the didn't hurt, either. XXL positioned it at number 22 on their list of the best songs of 2013. In February 2014, Complex named it the fifth best song that DJ Mustard had produced.

Awards and nominations

Chart performance 

"My Nigga" debuted at number 67 on the Billboard Hot 100 the week of October 19, 2013. Six weeks later, it peaked at number 19 on the week of November 30, 2013. It stayed in the Top 30 for fourteen weeks before reaching number 19 again on the week of March 15, 2014. It spent a total of twenty-eight weeks on the chart. As of March 16, 2014, the song has sold 1,204,457 copies in the United States according to Nielsen SoundScan. On April 4, 2018, the single was certified quadruple platinum by the Recording Industry Association of America (RIAA) for combined sales and streaming data of over four million units in the United States.

Live performances 
In promotion of the single, YG performed it many times on television and other major venues. On December 3, 2013, YG performed the song for the first time on national television, on DJ Skee's SKEE Live on AXS TV. On January 28, 2014, YG performed "My Nigga" alongside Rich Homie Quan, DJ Mustard and Jeezy on The Arsenio Hall Show. Following the performance, YG was presented with the official platinum plaque from the RIAA commemorating sales of over 1,000,000 copies of the single. YG then performed the song multiple times during SXSW during March 2014. Then on March 19, 2014, YG performed "My Nigga" along with DJ Mustard and Jeezy on Jimmy Kimmel Live!.

Music video 
On August 16, 2013, CTE World released the trailer to the music video, shortly after the release of Boss Yo Life Up Gang. On September 4, 2013, YG and Jeezy appeared on MTV's RapFix. During the interview YG announced that his debut album would be titled My Krazy Life, and be released on November 19, 2013. At the closing of the show they premiered the music video for "My Nigga", which had been filmed a month prior in Atlanta, Georgia. As of April 2020, the music video has over 329 million views on YouTube. Kid Ink makes a cameo appearance.

Remixes 
On December 27, 2013, Rick Ross and Triple C's Young Breed released a remix to "My Nigga" dubbed as the "Black Bottle Boys MMGMIX". They then released a music video for their remix three days later. On January 12, 2014, Chinx Drugz and Troy Ave released a remix to the song.

On January 22, 2014, the official remix to the song was released, it featured Lil Wayne, Meek Mill, Rich Homie Quan and Nicki Minaj. Five days later, the music video for the remix took place in Los Angeles with YG, Lil Wayne, Meek Mill, Nicki Minaj, and Jeezy among others. The remix was also released as a single for digital download on the same day. On February 20, 2014, YG premiered a preview of the music at a listening session for My Krazy Life. The video featured cameo appearances from Lil Durk, DJ Mustard and Ty Dolla Sign among others.

In 2022 Dominican rapper El Alfa released a remix of My Nigga titled “Ma Nigga” which features YG, Braulio Fogon, Almighty, and Dowba Montana.

Charts

Weekly charts

Year-end charts

Certifications

Release history

References

External links

2013 singles
2013 songs
YG (rapper) songs
Jeezy songs
Rich Homie Quan songs
Def Jam Recordings singles
Song recordings produced by Mustard (record producer)
Songs written by Jeezy
Songs written by Lil Wayne
Songs written by Snoop Dogg
Songs written by Mustard (record producer)
Gangsta rap songs
Songs written by YG (rapper)
Songs about friendship